The Cult of Sincerity is an independent film about hipster culture and postmodernist irony set in Williamsburg in Brooklyn. It was released in its entirety on YouTube on April 8, 2008, making it the first time that YouTube had partnered with filmmakers for a film premiere. The film was later released as a digital download, with some of the proceeds going to the charity Fount of Mercy.

Production
The filmmakers collaborated with Amie Street, a digital music site for indie musicians, to help pay for the production.

Plot
When his mother informs Joseph that she's divorcing his father Joseph enters into a protracted existential crisis. Unhappy with the way society is moving, Joseph decides to attempt to turn back the flow of cynicism with a series of well-intentioned gestures and a slogan that he can put on a t-shirt. As Joseph struggles to find that slogan, he quickly realizes that it is not very easy changing the world.

See also
Digital distribution
New Sincerity
Postmodernist film

References

External links

2008 films
2008 comedy films
2008 YouTube videos
American independent films
Films set in Brooklyn
2000s English-language films
2000s American films
Films released on YouTube